Bai Yu is an actress. She is the president of Palette Pictures LLC, which she founded in 2009. She is a Beijing native.

Career
Prior to studying in America, Bai Yu was an actress and singer in China. She won the "Best New Personality Award" at the Fifth China Central Television (CCTV) Chinese Music Television Competition and subsequently a "Gold Award" at the national Jun Lu Music Video Competition. She went on to become a lead actress in national television, including Absolute Truth and Modern Family, a popular CCTV-produced series.

During her studies in Los Angeles, Bai Yu produced a 14-episode documentary series, Oceans Away, which was commissioned by CCTV and shot in six cities across America.

In 2013, Bai Yu produced and acted in the feature film Day of Redemption (早见晚爱). She also produced several award-winning short film series.

In 2014, Bai Yu directed, produced and wrote the web TV spy thriller series, The Substitute. The show aired on November 29, 2015, on the Chinese streaming service iQIYI, and received 100 million hits in 10 days after launch.

Filmography

References

External links 
 Palette Pictures

Living people
People's Liberation Army Academy of Art alumni
California Institute of the Arts alumni
Singers from Beijing
Actresses from Beijing
Chinese television producers
Chinese film producers
Chinese television directors
Women television producers
Year of birth missing (living people)
Women television directors